Elizabeth Cairns can refer to:
 Elizabeth Cairns (memoirist) (1685–1714), Scottish Calvinist lay preacher and memoirist
 Elizabeth Cairns (rugby union) (born 1992), American rugby union player